Little Revolutions Two is the second compilation album from Duke Special. It contains covers, B sides and rarities. It was released in February 2011 on the Reel to Reel Label.

Track listing

References

Duke Special albums